Karun Dubey (born 30 May 1955) is an Indian former cricketer. He played first-class cricket for Bengal, Delhi and Orissa.

See also
 List of Bengal cricketers
 List of Delhi cricketers

References

External links
 

1955 births
Living people
Indian cricketers
Bengal cricketers
Delhi cricketers
Odisha cricketers
Cricketers from Delhi